Zoran Škerjanc (born 25 November 1964) is a retired Croatian football player who played for Rijeka, Dinamo, Recreativo Huelva, Orléans US, Pazinka and Göttingen 05.

Career statistics

As a player

References

External links
 http://www.bdfutbol.com/j/j11995.html

1964 births
Living people
Footballers from Rijeka
Association football midfielders
Yugoslav footballers
Croatian footballers
HNK Rijeka players
GNK Dinamo Zagreb players
Recreativo de Huelva players
US Orléans players
NK Pazinka players
Yugoslav First League players
Segunda División players
Croatian Football League players
Yugoslav expatriate footballers
Expatriate footballers in Spain
Yugoslav expatriate sportspeople in Spain
Expatriate footballers in France
Yugoslav expatriate sportspeople in France
Croatian expatriate footballers
Expatriate footballers in Germany
Croatian expatriate sportspeople in Germany
HNK Rijeka non-playing staff